German submarine U-518 was a Type IXC U-boat of the Nazi Germany's Kriegsmarine during World War II. She saw considerable success from her launch on 11 February 1942 until she was sunk on 22 April 1945. The U-boat was laid down at the Deutsche Werft in Hamburg as yard number 314 on 12 June 1941, and commissioned on 25 April 1942 with Fregattenkapitän Hans-Günther Brachmann in command. He was replaced on 19 August 1942 by Kapitänleutnant Friedrich-Wilhelm Wissmann.
She sank nine ships and damaged three more in seven active patrols. U-518 had a crew of 56, and was by then commanded by Oberleutnant zur See Hans-Werner Offermann from 13 January 1944.

Design
German Type IXC submarines were slightly larger than the original Type IXBs. U-518 had a displacement of  when at the surface and  while submerged. She had two shafts and two  propellers.

U-518 was fitted with six  torpedo tubes (four fitted at the bow and two at the stern), 22 torpedoes, one  SK C/32 naval gun, 180 rounds, and a  SK C/30 as well as a  C/30 anti-aircraft gun. The boat had a complement of forty-eight.

Service history

First patrol
She left Kiel on 26 September 1942, by-passed the British Isles via the gap between Iceland and the Faeroe Islands and crossed the Atlantic. She entered Conception Bay, Newfoundland and near Bell Island sank the Free French PLM 27 and the Canadian Rose Castle on 2 November. A week later, on 9 November, she put a German spy named Werner von Janowski ashore at New Carlisle, Quebec.

Moving out into the Atlantic proper, she attacked other ships, such as the British Empire Sailor on the 21st and the American Caddo on the 23rd. With these and other successes behind her, she moved to her new home base, Lorient in occupied France, arriving on 15 December 1942.

Second patrol
Leaving Lorient on 11 January 1943, she sailed to the eastern Brazilian coast and on 14 February 1943 came under attack from unidentified Allied aircraft; she sustained minimal damage Between 18 February and 25 March, she sank another four ships. On the return journey, she passed through the Cape Verde Islands, west of the Canary Islands and east of the Azores, arriving back at Lorient on 27 April 1943 after a patrol lasting 107 days.

Third patrol
Her third sortie was marked by a depth charge and strafing attack on 27 June 1943 by a Sunderland flying boat of No. 201 Squadron RAF. The damage incurred was serious enough to warrant her return which was hampered by another attack by a Sunderland, this time from No. 10 Squadron RAAF on 30 June in the Bay of Biscay. This incident caused no further damage, but the aircraft's rear gunner was mortally wounded. The boat docked in Bordeaux on 3 July.

Fourth patrol
She spent fifteen weeks on patrol which included a presence in the Gulf of Mexico, between 18 August and 1 December 1943, with no results.

Fifth patrol
Another long patrol saw the boat in the Caribbean where she torpedoed the Panamanian Valera. The ship broke in two before sinking. The submarine had departed Lorient on 23 January 1944 and returned there on 10 July.

She was on non-active patrol afterwards. Traveling from port to port, lasting from 4 to 10 July 1944, with no results.

Sixth patrol
By now, the Allies were besieging the Atlantic ports on the landward side; the boat departed Lorient for the last time on 15 July 1944. Allied escort ships attacked a submarine in mid-ocean, probably U-518, on 9 August. She next turned up, on the eastern US coast, where she damaged the American George Ade. She then withdrew to Kristiansand in Norway, arriving on 24 October 1944.

She was on non-active patrol again afterwards. Both of these voyages from 25 to 28 October 1944 and 5 to 10 March 1945 were between ports and produced no results.

Seventh patrol and loss 
Her last foray began when she departed Kristiansand on 12 March 1945. There were no survivors.

Wolfpacks
U-518 took part in two wolfpacks, namely:
 Panther (7 – 11 October 1942) 
 Seewolf (14 – 22 April 1945)

Summary of raiding history

References

Bibliography

External links

World War II submarines of Germany
German Type IX submarines
U-boats commissioned in 1942
U-boats sunk in 1945
U-boats sunk by depth charges
U-boats sunk by US warships
World War II shipwrecks in the Atlantic Ocean
1942 ships
Ships built in Hamburg
Ships lost with all hands
Maritime incidents in April 1945